Rodney Crowell is the third studio album by the American country music artist of the same name. It was released in 1981 (see 1981 in country music) by Warner Bros. Records and was his last album on that label before switching to Columbia. It was the first album Crowell produced by himself. It reached #47 on the Top Country Albums chart and #105 on the Billboard 200 albums chart. The songs, "Stars on the Water" and "Victim or a Fool" were released as singles. "Stars on the Water" reached #30 on the Hot Country Songs chart, his highest-charting song up to that point. It peaked at #21 on the Canadian country charts. "Victim or a Fool" reached #34 in the U.S. The album was rereleased on compact disc in 2005 paired with his previous album But What Will the Neighbors Think.

Content
"She Ain't Goin' Nowhere" was written and recorded by Guy Clark in 1975 for his debut album Old No. 1. Later versions of the song change the "Goin'" to "going".

"Old Pipeliner" was first recorded in 1967 by Red Sovine on his album Dear John Letter. “Pipeliner Blues” AKA “Old Pipeliner” was written, published, and first recorded in 1940 by, piano playing Grand Ole Opry Star, Moon Mullican.

The opening track, "Stars on the Water" was first covered in 1983 by Jimmy Buffett on his album One Particular Harbour. George Strait included a cover on his album The Road Less Traveled in 2001.

"Shame on the Moon" was covered in 1982 by Mac Davis and Bob Seger & the Silver Bullet Band. The latter released the song as a single from their album The Distance where it became a #2 hit. Tanya Tucker also covered the song in 1983 for her album Changes.

"'Til I Gain Control Again" had been recorded by Emmylou Harris on her 1975 album Elite Hotel by Waylon Jennings on his 1977 album Ol' Waylon and by Willie Nelson on Willie and Family Live.  It became a number 1 hit for Crystal Gayle in late 1982. In 1993, the song was covered by Canadian country rock band Blue Rodeo for their album Five Days in July. Released as a single in 1994, the song peaked at number 24 on the RPM Country Tracks chart. Guitarist Albert Lee would record a version in 2002 for his album Albert Lee & Hogan's Heroes.

Track listing
All tracks composed by Rodney Crowell; except where indicated
Side 1
"Stars on the Water" - 3:47
"Just Wanta Dance" (Keith Sykes) - 2:27
"She Ain't Going Nowhere" (Guy Clark) - 3:51
"Don't Need No Other Now" - 3:25
"Shame on the Moon" - 4:44
Side 2
"Only Two Hearts" (Rodney Crowell, Hank DeVito) - 2:56
"Victim or a Fool" - 3:00
"All You've Got to Do" (Crowell, DeVito) - 3:34
"'Til I Gain Control Again" - 5:11
"Old Pipeliner" (Tommy Hill, Ray King) - 3:02

Personnel
Richard Bennett - acoustic guitar, electric guitar
Tony Brown - piano, electric piano, keyboards, background vocals
Rosemary Butler - background & harmony vocals
Rosanne Cash - background & harmony vocals
Rodney Crowell - lead vocals, acoustic guitar
Hank DeVito - electric guitar, steel guitar, slide guitar
Vince Gill - acoustic guitar, electric guitar, harmony & background vocals
Emory Gordy Jr. - acoustic guitar, bass guitar, piano, upright bass, electric guitar, piano, string arrangements
Booker T. Jones - organ, piano, keyboards
Phil Kenzie - horns, saxophone
Bill Lamb - horn
Albert Lee - acoustic guitar, electric guitar, piano, harmony & background vocals
Larrie Londin - drums, percussion
Larry Willoughby - background & harmony vocals

Chart performance

Album

Singles

Sources

CMT
Allmusic (see infobox)
AOL Music profile

1981 albums
Rodney Crowell albums
Warner Records albums
Albums produced by Rodney Crowell